Pedro Tanausú Domínguez Placeres (born 20 September 1990), commonly known as Tana, is a Spanish professional footballer who plays as a forward.

Club career
Born in Las Palmas, Canary Islands, Tana made his senior debut with lowly UD Villa de Santa Brígida in the 2009–10 season. Two years later he first arrived in Segunda División B, playing for UD Vecindario.

In January 2012, Tana signed with UD Las Palmas, being initially assigned to the third team. He was promoted to the reserves the following year, with whom he reached promotion to the third division at the end of 2012–13 campaign.

In August 2013, Tana was promoted to the main squad in the Segunda División, and made his debut as a professional late in that month by coming on as a 59th-minute substitute for Jesús Tato in a 1–1 home draw against SD Eibar. He scored his first goal in the competition on 5 October, in the 2–0 home win over Córdoba CF.

Tana contributed only one league appearance during 2014–15, as the Amarillos achieved promotion to La Liga. His maiden appearance in the Spanish top flight occurred on 25 October 2015, as he started in a 0–0 home draw against Villarreal CF.

A starter under new manager Quique Setién, Tana signed a new three-year deal with Las Palmas on 25 November 2015. He scored his first goal in the top tier on 30 December, opening a 4–1 home rout of Granada CF.

Tana renewed with Las Palmas on 7 April 2016, until 2019. On 20 September 2018, he further extended his link until 2023.

On 31 January 2019, Tana was loaned to a Chinese club until the end of the year, later revealed to be Zhejiang Greentown FC. On 3 September 2020, his contract was terminated by the board of directors due to "disciplinary reasons".

On 1 January 2021, free agent Tana agreed to a short-term deal with Albacete Balompié in the second division.

In 2022, Tana moved to Dhivehi Premier League side Maziya S&RC and appeared in the 2022 AFC Cup group stage matches in India, where he created seventeen chances and scored twice.

On 13 August 2022, it was announced by the Indian I-League side Churchill Brothers that they have completed their foreign quota for the season with signing of Tana. On 16 January 2023, Tana was released by Churchill Brothers, and replaced him with Uruguayan Martín Cháves. He made eleven appearances for the club and has two goals and two assists to his name.

NorthEast United 
In January 2023, Indian Super League club NorthEast United brought in Tana on a short-term deal.

Career statistics

Club

Honours
Maziya S&RC
Dhivehi Premier League: 2022

Churchill Brothers
Baji Rout Cup runner-up: 2022

References

External links

1990 births
Living people
Spanish footballers
Footballers from Las Palmas
Association football wingers
Association football forwards
La Liga players
Segunda División players
Segunda División B players
Tercera División players
Divisiones Regionales de Fútbol players
UD Vecindario players
UD Las Palmas C players
UD Las Palmas Atlético players
UD Las Palmas players
Albacete Balompié players
China League One players
Zhejiang Professional F.C. players
Maziya S&RC players
Spanish expatriate footballers
Expatriate footballers in China
Expatriate footballers in the Maldives
Spanish expatriate sportspeople in China